"My Army" is a  Soviet marching song written in the Russian language, performed by the Alexandrov Ensemble. The lyrics were written by Soviet musician and composer Rafael Moritsovich Plaksin. The music was composed by prolific Soviet composer Aleksandr Aleksandrovich Abramov, in 1970.

A Persian language version of this song is also adopted by the National Liberation Army, the armed wing of the People's Mujahedin of Iran.

Lyrics

See also
SovMusic entry for My Army, containing the song in Russian
My Army (Армия моя) on You Tube

References

Russian military songs
March music
Russian military marches
Military music
1970 songs
Soviet songs